Mark M. Gillen (born November 6, 1955) is an American politician and member of the Republican Party. In 2010, he was elected to represent the 128th District in the Pennsylvania House of Representatives. The seat had been vacated by Republican Sam Rohrer, who had unsuccessfully challenged State Attorney General Tom Corbett in the May 2010 Republican gubernatorial primary. Gillen is currently serving on the Aging and Older Adult Services, Education, Labor and Industry, and Veterans Affairs and Emergency Preparedness committees.
He is president of and co-founded the Berks Military History Museum, located in Mohnton, Pennsylvania.
Gillen had previously served as a Mohnton borough councilman. He lives in Robeson Township with his wife, Kim, and their five daughters.

References

External links
State Representative Mark Gillen official caucus website
Mark Gillen (R) official PA House website

Republican Party members of the Pennsylvania House of Representatives
Living people
1955 births
Bob Jones University alumni
Kutztown University of Pennsylvania alumni
People from Birdsboro, Pennsylvania
21st-century American politicians